Ramsey is a village in Fayette County, Illinois, United States. The population was 1,063 in 2018. Between 2017 and 2018 the population of Ramsey, IL declined from 1,225 to 1,063, a -13.2% decrease.

The village was named after Alexander Ramsey (1815–1903), an American politician, second governor of Minnesota.

Geography
U.S. Route 51 passes through the center of town, leading north  to Pana and south  to Vandalia, the county seat.

Demographics

At the 2000 census, there were 1,056 people, 441 households and 287 families residing in the village. The racial makeup of the village was 99.24% White, 0.38% Native American, 0.09% Asian, and 0.28% from two or more races. Hispanic or Latino of any race were 0.19% of the population.

There were 441 households, of which 30.6% had children under the age of 18 living with them, 49.7% were married couples living together, 11.3% had a female householder with no husband present, and 34.7% were non-families. 32.2% of all households were made up of individuals, and 18.6% had someone living alone who was 65 years of age or older. The average household size was 2.39 and the average family size was 3.01.

27.4% of the population were under the age of 18, 9.9% from 18 to 24, 26.7% from 25 to 44, 18.7% from 45 to 64, and 17.3% who were 65 years of age or older. The median age was 34 years. For every 100 females, there were 96.3 males. For every 100 females age 18 and over, there were 92.2 males.

The median household income was $29,792 and the median family income was $36,354. Males had a median income of $30,893 and females $18,846. The per capita income was $13,878. About 9.3% of families and 13.0% of the population were below the poverty line, including 17.9% of those under age 18 and 10.2% of those age 65 or over.

Notable people

 Glen Hobbie, baseball player, resident of Ramsey at the time of his death in 2013<ref>"Glen F Hobbie, 77", The Journal-News, August 11, 2013</ref>
 H. L. Hunt, oil tycoon, inspired the 1980s television series Dallas'', born near Ramsey
 John Staff, Sergeant of the US Army, shot in Berlin by East German police on November 25, 1949; born in Ramsey
 Tex Williams, country and swing musician ("Smoke! Smoke! Smoke! (That Cigarette)"), born in Ramsey

References

Villages in Fayette County, Illinois
Villages in Illinois